Tahtalı Dam is a dam in Izmir Province, Turkey, built between 1986 and 1999. The development was backed by the Turkish State Hydraulic Works.

History
The dam was built over what used to be the settlement of Bulgurca.

See also
List of dams and reservoirs in Turkey

References
DSI directory, State Hydraulic Works (Turkey), Retrieved December 16, 2009

Dams in İzmir Province